Jhonas Erik Enroth (born 25 June 1988), a Swedish professional ice hockey goaltender, who is currently playing with Örebro HK of the Swedish Hockey League (SHL). He played in the National Hockey League (NHL) for the Buffalo Sabres, Dallas Stars, Los Angeles Kings and Toronto Maple Leafs between 2009 and 2016. Internationally Enroth has played for the Swedish national team in several tournaments, including three World Championships, winning a gold medal in 2013 and the 2018 Winter Olympics.

Playing career
Enroth was selected on 24 June 2006, by the Buffalo Sabres as their second draft choice (46th overall), in the second round of the 2006 NHL Entry Draft.

In 2007, he was named as the first of four candidates for Elitserien 2008 Rookie of the Year. The award was won by another goaltender, Daniel Larsson. He ended the 2007–08 regular season in Sweden as the leading goaltender in save percentage and goals against average. On 31 May 2008, Enroth signed a three-year level entry contract with the Buffalo Sabres in the NHL. He also was the top European goaltender in the 2006 NHL Entry Draft. He had his first NHL pre-season appearance on 22 September, playing the second half of the game for the Buffalo Sabres.

On 22 February 2009, he was recalled to Buffalo from the Portland Pirates before he was returned to the Pirates without featuring in a game. On 4 November 2009, he was recalled again to Buffalo. Enroth made his NHL debut against the Boston Bruins 7 November 2009 in a losing effort, giving up four goals. He did not get another chance at the NHL level until 3 November 2010 of the 2010–11 NHL season, when he played 20 minutes of an away game against the Boston Bruins, allowing three goals on just twelve shots to record his second NHL loss.

Enroth recorded his first NHL victory in a shootout over the Toronto Maple Leafs by the score of 3–2 on 6 November 2010 in Toronto; his second NHL victory also came in a shootout against the New Jersey Devils on 10 November 2010. His third NHL victory came in a ten-round shootout against the Montreal Canadiens on 15 February 2011, which, in winning, he became the first goaltender in NHL history to record all three of his first wins in shootouts.

Enroth earned his first NHL shutout on 30 March 2011 against the New York Rangers stopping 23 shots. On 4 April 2011, Enroth was named one of NHL's three stars for the week ending 3 April. On 26 April 2011, Enroth appeared in his first NHL playoff game, relieving Ryan Miller. His debut saw the majority of the third period, allowing one goal in eight shots against. Enroth was named to the 2011–12 All-Rookie Team during the NHL Awards on 20 June 2012. He was the sixth player in Sabres franchise history to be named to the All-Rookie Team.

During the 2012–13 NHL Lockout Enroth remained in Sweden. He first practiced with his original club Huddinge IK and played two games with them in the Hockeyettan. He then signed with Almtuna IS from Uppsala just north of Stockholm, in the second-tier league, and played there until the NHL season started.

On 20 June 2013, Enroth signed a two-year deal to remain with the Sabres. Enroth was promoted to starting goaltender on 28 February 2014, after the Sabres traded Ryan Miller, their previous starting goaltender, to the St. Louis Blues.

On 11 February 2015, Enroth was traded by the Sabres, to the Dallas Stars in exchange for Anders Lindbäck and a conditional 3rd-round draft pick.

On 1 July 2015, Enroth signed a one-year contract to assume the backup position to Jonathan Quick on the Los Angeles Kings. Enroth recorded impressive statistics in his limited role with the club but admitted once the season ended that he was disappointed with his lack of playing time, having dressed for only 16 contests.

On 22 August 2016, Enroth signed as a free agent to a one-year contract with the Toronto Maple Leafs, to back up Frederik Andersen following the trade of Jonathan Bernier a month prior. Though he was expected to play more games than he did with the Kings, Enroth struggled with the Maple Leafs, going winless in his six appearances and only starting in four of those games. With Andersen excelling, Entroth was waived on 5 December 2016 to be sent to the Toronto Marlies. He cleared the following day. The next month would only see Enroth appear in three games with the Marlies (two of them in relief) due to a crowded crease. Following the Maple Leafs' acquisition of Curtis McElhinney via waivers on 10 January 2017, Enroth was traded to the Anaheim Ducks in exchange for a seventh-round pick in 2018 at 1 AM (EST) on 11 January.

As a free agent from the Ducks, Enroth, with limited opportunity to extend his NHL career, opted to sign abroad in agreeing to a one-year deal with Belarusian club, HC Dinamo Minsk of the Kontinental Hockey League (KHL), on 13 July 2017.

In the 2018–19 season, playing in his second season with Dinamo and in last year of his contract, Enroth appeared in 52 games for club, sporting a 2.60 goal against average, however was unable to propel Dinamo to the playoffs. On 15 February 2019, Enroth left Minsk to join Swedish club, Örebro HK of the SHL, for the remainder of the season.

On 2 July 2019, Enroth returned to Dinamo Minsk of the KHL, signing a one-year contract. In the 2019–20 season, Enroth collected just 7 wins in 30 games for the bottom placed Dinamo Minsk. With the KHL regular season nearing conclusion, Enroth left Dinamo to join Austrian club, EC KAC of the EBEL, for the remainder of the season on 14 February 2020.

International play

Enroth first played at the international junior level with Sweden at the 2005 IIHF World U18 Championships, helping capture the bronze medal. He appeared in 16 games at the junior level at the Under 18 level and World Junior Championships.

Enroth made his senior debut with the Swedish National Team appearing in 2 games at the 2012 World Championships.  With the Sabres outside the Stanley Cup playoffs, following the shortened 2012–13 season, the door was open for the Tre Kronor, and he went on to play in the World Championships, where Sweden broke a 27-year-old curse and won the gold medal. It marked the first time since 1986 a hosting nation won the title. Enroth was highly acclaimed for his efforts and was selected in the All Star Team of the tournament.

He was selected to the Swedish squad as the team's third choice goaltender at the 2014 Winter Olympics in Sochi. He did not feature in a game, as Sweden claimed the silver medal.

Career statistics

Regular season and playoffs

International

Awards and honours

References

External links
 

1988 births
Living people
Almtuna IS players
Buffalo Sabres draft picks
Buffalo Sabres players
Dallas Stars players
HC Dinamo Minsk players
Huddinge IK players
Ice hockey players at the 2014 Winter Olympics
Ice hockey players at the 2018 Winter Olympics
EC KAC players
Los Angeles Kings players
Medalists at the 2014 Winter Olympics
Olympic ice hockey players of Sweden
Olympic medalists in ice hockey
Olympic silver medalists for Sweden
Örebro HK players
Portland Pirates players
San Diego Gulls (AHL) players
Södertälje SK players
Ice hockey people from Stockholm
Swedish expatriate ice hockey players in the United States
Swedish ice hockey goaltenders
Toronto Maple Leafs players
Toronto Marlies players